Wat Phanan Choeng (pronunciation) is a Buddhist temple in the city of Ayutthaya, Thailand, on the east bank of the Chao Phraya River at the south-eastern side of the confluence of the Chao Phraya and Pa Sak rivers.

Today, as part of the Ayutthaya Historical Park, the temple is a popular tourist attraction.

History

Founding
Built in 1324, some 27 years before the city of Ayutthaya was officially founded, the temple must have been partly connected to early settlements in the area. These notably allegedly included a 200-strong refugee community from Song Dynasty China.

The large wihan, the highest building within the temple complex, houses an immense gilded 19 meter high seated Buddha from 1334 CE. This highly revered Buddha statue is called Luang Pho Tho by Thais, and Sam Pao Kong by Thai-Chinese. The statue is regarded as a guardian for mariners. Allegedly, prior to the destruction of Ayutthaya by the Burmese in 1767 CE, "tears flowed from the sacred eyes to the sacred navel". The statue has been restored several times in history. King Mongkut named the statue Phra Puttha Thrai Ratana Nayok after its restoration in 1854 CE.

Visit by Zheng He
The temple was visited in 1407 CE by Zheng He, a Chinese Muslim eunuch admiral from Yunnan who leading his second Ming imperial voyage. He bestowed gifts upon the temple in a great ceremony that included Siamese royal participation, and is today remembered by Thai-Chinese visitors who still visit the temple in his honour.

Visiting information 
Wat Phanan Choeng is located in Khlong Suan Plu Sub-district, Phra Nakhon Si Ayutthaya District, Phra Nakhon Si Ayutthaya, Thailand, 13000.

It is open daily from 8 am to 5 pm. The entrance fee is 20 baht, paid at a small booth at the entrance.

The temple may be reached brom Bangkok by road Asia (Highway 32).

Via public transit, the temple may be reached from New Mor Chit station, where there are many buses to Ayutthaya every day. It may also be reached by vans at the Victory Monument or Future Park Rangsit. One may also take a motorcycle taxi or auto rickshaw to Wat Phanan Choeng.

By train, after going from Bangkok railway station to Ayutthaya railway station, one may take a motorcycle taxi or auto rickshaw to reach the temple.

References

Phanan Choeng
Thai Theravada Buddhist temples and monasteries
Buildings and structures on the Chao Phraya River